is a Japanese light novel series written by Riku Misora and illustrated by Saba Mizore. SB Creative published the series in four volumes from April 2020 to September 2022. A manga adaptation, illustrated by Kakito Kato, began serialization on the Manga UP! website in May 2022. As of October 2022, the manga's individual chapters have been collected into a single volume.

Media

Light novel
Written by Riku Misora and illustrated by Saba Mizore, the series began publication under SB Creative's GA Bunko light novel imprint on April 14, 2020. The series was completed in its fourth volume, which released on September 14, 2022.

Tentai Books is publishing the series in English.

Volume list

Manga
A manga adaptation, illustrated by Kakito Kato, began serialization on Square Enix's Manga UP! website on May 28, 2022. As of October 2022, the series' individual chapters have been collected into a single tankōbon volume.

Volume list

Reception
In the 2021 edition of the Kono Light Novel ga Sugoi! guidebook, the series ranked eighth in the bunkobon category and fifth in the new work category.

See also
 Seiyū Radio no Ura Omote, another light novel series illustrated by Saba Mizore
 Yumemiru Danshi wa Genjitsushugisha, another light novel series illustrated by Saba Mizore

References

External links
 

2020 Japanese novels
Anime and manga based on light novels
GA Bunko
Gangan Comics manga
Japanese webcomics
Light novels
Romantic comedy anime and manga
Shōnen manga
Webcomics in print